Rémi Ingres (born 30 July 1969) is a French short track speed skater. He competed in the men's 5000 metre relay event at the 1992 Winter Olympics.

References

1969 births
Living people
French male short track speed skaters
Olympic short track speed skaters of France
Short track speed skaters at the 1992 Winter Olympics
Sportspeople from Paris